Bipalium vagum is a land planarian in the subfamily Bipaliinae. It has been accidentally introduced in the United States, Bermuda and various islands in the Caribbean  and was recorded for the first time in Europe, in Italy, in 2021.

Description 
The head varies from entirely black to dark brown with two black patches separated by a lighter ground color. The neck has a black collar interrupted only at the creeping sole. The dorsal color of the body is light brown and a broad black stripe runs longitudinally from the black collar to the posterior end. Laterally, there are two diffuse dark brown stripes.

Feeding Habits 
Differently from other invasive species of Bipalium, which feed on earthworms, B. vagum seems to feed exclusively on gastropods. As it seems to be spreading throughout the Caribbean and southern United States, there is certain concern on its possible impacts on the native gastropod fauna.

References 

Geoplanidae